The 1907 Cornell Big Red football team was an American football team that represented Cornell University during the 1907 college football season.  In their first season under head coach Henry Schoellkopf, the Big Red compiled an 8–2 record and outscored all opponents by a combined total of 176 to 45. Four Cornell players received honors on the 1907 College Football All-America Team: tackle Bernard O'Rourke (WC-2; CW-2; NYP; CF); guard Elmer Thompson (WC-2; CW-2; NYH; NYW; NYP; FY-1, AFR); end Charles H. Watson (CF); and halfback Edward L. McCallie, Cornell (NYW).

Schedule

References

Cornell
Cornell Big Red football seasons
Cornell Big Red football